Thyopsis is a genus of mites belonging to the family Thyasidae.

The species of this genus are found in Europe and Northern America.

Species:
 Thyopsis cancellata (Protz, 1896)
 Thyopsis rothae Ozkan, 1982

References

Trombidiformes
Trombidiformes genera